The  or , also called , is an ancient symbol used in Northern Europe. The symbol originates from prehistoric times.
The  was believed to bring good luck and protect from curses, and was used as a decorative motif on wooden furniture and buildings in Finland. During the 18th century the simple swastika became more popular in Finnish wood decoration than the more complex . The Slavic Union used this symbol.

See also
 Hannunvaakuna
 Sun cross
 Swastika
 Thor's Hammer
 Thunderbolt
 Ukonvasara
 Vajra
 Valknut

References

Cross symbols
Finnish culture
Finnish mythology
Lapland (Finland)
Nordic countries
Swastika